Pasión Prohibida is a Spanish-language romantic drama telenovela produced by United States-based television network Telemundo Television Studios, Miami. It is a remake of the Turkish telenovela Aşk-ı Memnu by Ece Yörenç and Melek Gençoğlu. It has been adapted from Halit Ziya Uşaklıgil's novel Aşk-ı Memnu, published in 1900, but takes place in the modern-day Miami, instead of the novel's late 19th-century Istanbul setting. Jencarlos Canela and Mónica Spear starred as the protagonists. Although Telemundo announced a second season, Spear's 2014 murder brought an end to production.

United States broadcast 
Telemundo aired the serial during the 2013 season. From January 22, 2013 to June 21, 2013, Telemundo aired Pasión Prohibida weeknights at 8 pm/7c, replacing Rosa Diamante. Dama y Obrero replaced Pasión Prohibida on June 24, 2013. As with most of its other telenovelas, the network broadcast English subtitles as closed captions on CC3.

Cast

Main

Recurring

Awards and nominations

References

External links 
 Summary of the novel Aşk-ı Memnu at turkishauthors.com
 Official song of the telenovela 

2013 American television series debuts
2013 American television series endings
Spanish-language American telenovelas
Telemundo telenovelas
2013 telenovelas
Non-Turkish television series based on Turkish television series